The 2013 Lux Style Awards, officially known as the 12th Lux Style Awards, honoured the best Pakistani films of 2012 and took place on 12 October 2013 at Expo Centre, Lahore. 

During the ceremony, Lux Style Awards were awarded in 27 competitive categories. The ceremony was televised in Pakistan and internationally on ARY Digital. Actor Ahmed Ali Butt hosted the ceremony.

Background 
The Lux Style Awards is an award ceremony held annually in Pakistan since 2002. The awards celebrate "style" in the Pakistani entertainment industry, and honour the country's best talents in film, television, music, and fashion. Around 30 awards are given annually.

Winners and nominees 

Winners are listed first and highlighted in boldface.

Television

Music

Fashion

Special awards 

 Best Dressed Celebrity (Female): Aamina Sheikh
 Best Dressed Celebrity (Male): Ali Zeeshan

References

External links

Lux Style Awards ceremonies
2013 film awards
2013 television awards
2013 music awards
Lux
Lux
Lux